Allium orientale is a species of wild garlic/onion native to the eastern Mediterranean; Libya, Egypt, Sinai, the Levant, Cyprus and Anatolia. It has high genetic variation but is not widely distributed, suggesting that it may contain cryptic species.

References

External links
 

orientale
Plants described in 1854